The sex ratio of the different administrative divisions of China has been the subject of academic study because of a high imbalance in births since the 1990s and female infanticide further worsening the imbalanced sex ratios at birth.

Gender ratio for ages 1–4
The figures are from the intercensus survey of 2005, which was carried out in November 2005 on a representative 1% of the total population.

See also 
 Female infanticide in China
 Abortion in China
 Missing women of China
 List of countries by sex ratio

References

Gender

Gender in Asia
Abortion in China
Demographics of China
China, sex ratio